The competition for the Tunisian Golden Boot was instituted by the newspaper L'Action tunisienne in 1969–1970, with a jury made up of sports figures and journalists. It consists of assigning stars to players based on their performance in the league. It takes place until 1994–1995 under the sponsorship of the newspaper Le Renouveau but ends in confusion.

Winners

References 

Football in Tunisia